Haut-Uele District was a district of the Belgian Congo and the Democratic Republic of the Congo. It was formed from part of Uele District in 1912. It roughly corresponded in area to the present Haut-Uélé province.

Location

Haut-Uele District (Upper Uele District) was named after the Uele River, and covers the upper part of the river basin.

Belgian Congo

The Haut-Uele District was created by an arrêté royal of 28 March 1912, which divided the Congo into 22 districts.
A 1912 map shows that the former Uele District had been broken into the Haut-Uele and Bas-Uele (Lower Uele) districts.
Haut-Uele was bordered by French territory to the north, British territory to the east, Ituri and Stanleyville districts to the south and Bas-Uele to the west.
The Haut-Uele District became part of the Orientale Province created in 1913.

Kilo-Moto is a region in the far northeast corner of the Democratic Republic of the Congo (DRC) where gold was discovered in the Ituri River by government prospectors in 1903.  Moto is in the Haut-Uélé Province and  Kilo in the Ituri Province.
The Kilo mine was opened in 1905 and the Moto mine in 1911.
Gold was also extracted by panning the river gravels.
In 1919 the government created the Régie Industrielle des Mines de Kilo-Moto, an autonomous body.
At the end of 1919 Louis Franck, the Minister of the Colonies, gave Georges Moulaert, former governor of Équateur Province, responsibility for the Kilo-Moto state mines.
These were located in largely hostile territory, with no communications and very primitive operations.

Moulaert tackled improvements to roads, transport, medical support, supplies and crops, as well as mining installations, exploitation of alluvium and eluvium deposits, prospecting and research.
Between 1920 and 1924 the company built  of roads, with many metal bridges, and installed  of telegraph and telephone lines.
In 1924 a  hydroelectric power station was inaugurated at Soleniana and the grinding plant was electrified.
Due to poor transport across the Congo region, particularly the Matadi-Léopoldville Railway, the company developed a route from the Uele River to the Nile to transport cotton, coffee and other products of the region.

In 1926 the Régie was converted into a commercial company, the Société des Mines d’Or de Kilo-Moto.
Hydroelectric stations were built to power the crushing plants, and by 1930 the two mines, but mostly Kilo, were producing almost  annually.
Moulaert was made chairman of the board.
He continued to head the company until 1947.
Moulaert boosted gold production at Kilo-Moto, but his methods were questioned, particularly forced recruitment of Black workers, who totaled 10,012 in 1918 and over 40,000 in 1939.
Alexis Bertrand wrote a 1932 report that strongly criticized the practices at the Kilo-Moto gold mines.
The report said from 35% to 50% of able bodied adult men were forced to leave their homes to work the gold deposits, far above the official limit of 10% set by the Manpower Commission.
This caused public controversy.
Moulaert strongly defended "his" company, but criticism continued into the 1940s.

With the 1933 reorganization Bas-Uele and Haut-Uele were again combined into Uele District, and lay in the new Stanleyville Province.
By 1954 Stanleyville Province had been renamed Orientale Province, and Uele District had again been split into Bas-Uele and Haut-Uele districts.
A 1955–1957 map shows Haut-Uele District bordered by French territory to the north, Ituri District to the southeast, Stanleyville District to the southwest and Bas-Uele District to the west.

Post-independence

On 27 July 1962 the administration of Orientale Province was taken over by the central government.
It was divided into the new provinces of Kibali-Ituri, Uélé and Haut-Congo.
On 28 December 1966 Orientale Province was reunited.

The Durba Mine is a gold mine in the Haut-Uele Province of the Democratic Republic of the Congo, within the Kilo-Moto greenstone belt.
As of 2011 a joint venture between AngloGold Ashanti and Randgold Resources was actively developing the Kibali Gold Mine concession centered on this mine.
Between 1998 and 2000, co-circulating Marburg virus and Ravn virus caused 154 cases of Marburg virus disease and 128 deaths among illegal gold miners in Durba and nearby Watsa.

The 2008 Christmas massacres took place on 24–27 December 2008, when the Lord's Resistance Army (LRA), a Ugandan rebel group, attacked several villages in Haut-Uele District.
The Makombo massacre took place from 14 to 17 December 2009 in the village and region of Makombo in the Haut-Uele district.
Human Rights Watch (HRW) believes the attacks, which killed 321 people, were perpetrated by the Lord's Resistance Army (LRA), which denied responsibility.

In 2015 Orientale Province was broken up into the provinces of Bas-Uélé, Haut-Uélé, Ituri and Tshopo.

Maps

See also

Districts of the Belgian Congo

References

Sources

 

 

Districts of the Belgian Congo
Districts of Orientale Province